The axillary lines are the anterior axillary line, midaxillary line and the posterior axillary line.

The anterior axillary line 
is a coronal line on the anterior torso marked by the anterior axillary fold. It's the imaginary line that runs down from the point midway between the middle of the clavicle and the lateral end of the clavicle.

The V5 ECG lead is placed on the anterior axillary line, horizontally even with V4.

The midaxillary line is a coronal line on the torso between the anterior and posterior axillary lines.

It is a landmark used in thoracentesis, and the V6 electrode of the 10 electrode ECG.

The posterior axillary line is a coronal line on the posterior torso marked by the posterior axillary fold.

Additional images

See also

 List of anatomical lines

References

External links
 http://www.meddean.luc.edu/Lumen/MedEd/MEDICINE/PULMONAR/apd/lines.htm

Anatomy